Lotte Ledl (born 16 March 1930) is an Austrian actress.

Selected filmography
  The Forester of the Silver Wood (1954)
 The Dairymaid of St. Kathrein (1955)
 Kaiserjäger (1956)
 Forest Liesel (1956)
 Der Schandfleck (1956)
 Her Corporal (1956)
 War of the Maidens (1957)
 A Song Goes Round the World (1958)
 Tomorrow Is My Turn (1960)
 Max the Pickpocket (1961)
 Street of Temptation (1962)
 Apartmentzauber (1963)
 Schweik's Awkward Years (1964)
 Heidi (1965)
 Young Törless (1966)
 Die Klasse (TV film, 1968)
 My Father, the Ape and I (1971)
 Rudi, Behave! (1971)
 Derrick – Season 5, Episode 03: "Abendfrieden" (1978)
 Derrick – Season 8, Episode 02: "Am Abgrund" (1981)
 Derrick – Season 9, Episode 04: "Die Fahrt nach Lindau" (1982)
 '38 – Vienna Before the Fall (1985)
 Ein fast perfekter Seitensprung (TV film, 1995)
 Eine fast perfekte Scheidung (TV film, 1997)
 Eine fast perfekte Hochzeit (TV film, 1999)
  (TV film, 2008)
 The Decent One (2014), as Hedwig Potthast

External links

Nielsen Agency Bremen 

1930 births
Living people
Austrian film actresses
Austrian stage actresses
Austrian television actresses
20th-century Austrian actresses
21st-century Austrian actresses
Actresses from Vienna